Karl Stemolak (8 November 1875 – 14 April 1954) was an Austrian sculptor. His work was part of the art competitions at the 1936 Summer Olympics and the 1948 Summer Olympics.

References

Further reading
Erste Große Österreichische Kunstausstellung nach dem zweiten Weltkrieg“, 1947 - exhibition catalogueAusstellung „Der Hagenbund“, 40. Sonderausstellung, Museum der Stadt Wien, Autumn 1975 - exhibition catalogue
Prof. Peter Chrastek: Expressiv, neusachlich, verboten (Hagenbund und seine Künstler), 
Prof. Dr. Josef Gregor: "Karl Stemolak" in Wiener Jahrbuch für bildende Kunst 1922, Kunstverlag Anton Schroll & Co
Prof. Dr. Josef Gregor: "Karl Stemolak" in Der getreue Eckart'' Nr. 5, 1943

External links
Zierlart.at: "Karl Stemolak (1875 – 1954)", by Berthild Zierl

1875 births
1954 deaths
20th-century Austrian sculptors
Austrian male sculptors
Olympic competitors in art competitions
Artists from Graz
20th-century Austrian male artists